Mosby is a village and district in the Torridal valley in Kristiansand municipality in Agder county, Norway. The village lies along the river Otra, between the villages of Aukland and Strai (to the south) and the municipal border with Vennesla to the north.

Mosby's population in 1999 was 1,950, but since 2001 it has been considered to be a part of the urban area of Vennesla so separate village statistics are not tracked.

Neighbourhoods
Haus
Heisel
Høietun
Lindekleiv
Mosby
Øvre Mosby

Transportation

Notable People 

 Eva Margot (1944-2019), a painter.

References

Villages in Agder
Populated places in Agder
Geography of Kristiansand
Boroughs of Kristiansand